Lewis Sergeant (1841–1902) was an English journalist and author.

Life
The son of John Sergeant, a schoolmaster at Cheltenham School, and his wife Mary Anne, daughter of George Lewis, he was born at Barrow-on-Humber, Lincolnshire, on 10 November 1841. Adeline Sergeant was his first cousin, the daughter of Richard Sergeant, his father's brother.

After education under a private tutor, Sergeant matriculated at St Catharine's College, Cambridge, in 1861, graduating B.A. with mathematical honours in 1865. At the Cambridge Union he showed himself a Liberal and supporter of W. E. Gladstone. On leaving college, he spent a period as assistant master under Henry Hayman at Cheltenham grammar school.

Lewis then moved into journalism, becoming editor, in succession, of An anti-Game Law Journal, of The Examiner, and the Hereford Times. He then had a long period  with The Athenæum and with the London Daily Chronicle as lead writer. He was also a recognised authority on education, was elected to the council of the College of Preceptors, and edited the Educational Times from 1895 to 1902.

A Hellenophile, from 1878 Sergeant acted as secretary of the Greek committee in London.  George I of Greece bestowed on him the Order of the Redeemer in October 1878.

Sergeant died at Bournemouth on 3 February 1902.

Works
Sergeant's historical writings cover a wide range, and included:

England's Policy: its Traditions and Problems, Edinburgh, 1881.
William Pitt, in the "English Political Leaders" series, 1882.
John Wyclif, in the "Heroes of the Nations" series, 1893.
The Franks in the "Story of the Nations" series, 1898.

Sergeant published New Greece (1878, republished 1879), and Greece in 1880. There followed Greece in the Nineteenth Century: a Record of Hellenic Emancipation and Progress, 1821–1897, with illustrations, in 1897. He also wrote a volume of verse; a novel, The Caprice of Julia (1898); and other fiction pseudonymously.

Family
Sergeant married on 12 April 1871 Emma Louisa, daughter of James Robertson of Cheltenham. Philip Walsingham Sergeant, the author, was one of their children.

Notes

Attribution

External links

English writers
English biographers
English newspaper editors
English male journalists
1841 births
1902 deaths
People from Barrow upon Humber
Male biographers